The 2023 Tour de France Femmes, (officially Tour de France Femmes avec Zwift), will be the second edition of the Tour de France Femmes, one of women's cycling's two grand tours. The race is scheduled for 23 to 30 July 2023.

Route and stages 
In October 2022, the route was announced by race director Marion Rousse. The race will start in Clermont-Ferrand on the same day that the men's tour finishes in Paris, before heading south across the Massif Central towards the Pyrenees. The final stage will be an individual time trial in Pau, using a similar course to the 2019 edition of La Course by Le Tour de France. 2022 winner Annemiek van Vleuten called the route "an upgrade", with other riders welcoming the inclusion of bigger climbs and a time trial.

Broadcasting 
As with the 2022 edition, live television coverage will be provided by France Télévisions in conjunction with the European Broadcasting Union.

References

External links 
 Official website

Tour de France Femmes
Tour_de_France_Femmes
Tour_de_France_Femmes_2023
Tour_de_France_Femmes
2023 in French sport
Tour de France Femmes